The Third Sunday of Easter is the day that occurs two weeks after the Christian celebration of Easter.

Western Christianity 

In the historical Roman Rite of the Catholic Church, this day was officially known as the Second Sunday after Easter. It was also nicknamed Misericordia Sunday and Good Shepherd Sunday. The "Misericordia Sunday" designation was due to the incipit ("Misericórdia Dómini") of the introit assigned to this day's liturgy. The full text of the introit in its original Latin was: "Misericórdia Dómini plena est terra, allelúia: verbo Dómini caeli firmáti sunt, allelúia, allelúia. Exsultáte, iusti, in Dómino: rectos decet collaudátio." This introit is based on verses 5, 6, and 1 of Psalm 33. This day was called "Good Shepherd Sunday" due to the Gospel reading traditionally assigned to it.

In the 1970 revision of the Roman Missal, this day was designated the "Third Sunday of Easter." The "Misericórdia Dómini" introit for this Sunday was swapped with that of the following Sunday, and the "Good Shepherd" Gospel reading was likewise moved forward one week.

Local celebrations 

On some local liturgical calendars (such as that of the Capuchins and that of the Archdiocese of Seville), this Sunday was formerly known as the Feast of Our Lady, Mother of the Good Shepherd. (The Archdiocese of Seville now celebrates this feast as a memorial on the following Saturday.)

In Jerusalem and among the Franciscans, this Sunday was formerly celebrated as the Feast of the Holy Sepulchre.

Eastern Christianity 

In the Greek Orthodox Church, this day is called the Sunday of the Myrrhbearers.

Armenian Christianity celebrates on this day the dedication of the first Christian church on Mount Zion.

See also 
 Eastertide

References 

Christian Sunday observances
Eastertide